Xenosaurus rectocollaris, sometimes known as the pallid knob-scaled lizard, is a species of viviparous lizard. It is endemic to Mexico where it is known from the Sierra Madre de Oaxaca of Oaxaca and Puebla states. It is a rare species occurring in rock crevices in pristine semi-arid areas.

References

Xenosauridae
Endemic reptiles of Mexico
Fauna of the Sierra Madre de Oaxaca
Reptiles described in 1993
Taxa named by Hobart Muir Smith